The Grammy Award for Best Classical Instrumental Solo was first awarded during the annual Grammy Awards ceremony in 2012.

It combines the previous categories for Best Instrumental Soloist(s) Performance (with orchestra) and Best Instrumental Soloist Performance (without orchestra).

The restructuring of these categories was a result of the Recording Academy's wish to decrease the list of categories and awards.

The Grammy is awarded to the instrumental soloist(s) and to the conductor when applicable, and to the producer(s) and engineer(s) if they worked on over 50% of playing time of the recording.

Recipients

References

Classical Instrumental Solo